San Cipriano is a small village located at  above sea level on the Pacific, around the Danubio River, nearby the port of Buenaventura, Valle del Cauca Department, Colombia.

Overview

San Cipriano is known for its brujitas, small, flat, open train carts, usually made from wood and powered by motorbike, which use the abandoned railway and are the only way to get to the town. River tubing is also popular.

Climate
San Cipriano has a tropical rainforest climate (Af) with heavy to very heavy rainfall year-round.

References

External links

San Cipriano at Wikitravel

Populated places in the Valle del Cauca Department
Rivers of Colombia